The Canadian Country Spotlight is a weekly, one-hour country music spotlight program. Canadian Country Spotlight focuses and highlights Canadian country talent.  It's played weekly on country music radio stations all across Canada.  The show launched on Labour Day weekend 2011.  The show has featured Jason McCoy, George Canyon, Gord Bamford, Paul Brandt and many other Canadian country stars.

Canadian Country Spotlight Minute
In addition to the one-hour feature program, the Canadian Country Spotlight also includes a Monday-Friday 'Spotlight Minute' feature.  The Spotlight Minute contains a one-minute segment with the week's featured artist.  There are also social media links on the website and online music purchases are available.

Production team
 Executive Producer: Steve Parker
 Host: Ted Roop
 Online Host: Pete Walker
 Producer: Brian Cox

Website features
The website features the biographies of all artists that are featured on the show.  Another feature are the online interviews.  Each week, the featured artist's interview is played in its entirety with website host, Pete Walker.

References

External links

 Official website of The Canadian Country Spotlight
 Ted Roop's official website

Canadian country music radio programs
Syndicated Canadian radio programs